George Albee Hibbard (October 27, 1864 – May 29, 1910) was an American political figure who was the Mayor of Boston from 1908 to 1910.

Early years
Hibbard was born in Boston in 1864, graduated from Harvard University in 1880, and passed the bar in 1885.

Career
Hibbard became Postmaster of Boston in 1899. In the December 1907 mayoral election, Hibbard ran as a Republican against incumbent and Democratic candidate John F. Fitzgerald. Hibbard defeated Fitzgerald, 38,112 votes to 35,935; a third candidate, John Coulthurst, a Democrat running as the Independence League candidate, had 15,811 votes. Hibbard served as mayor from January 1908 to February 1910. He ran for re-election in January 1910, but finished third in a field of four nonpartisan candidates, with Fitzgerald winning.

Hibbard died in his Dorchester, Boston, home in May 1910 of tuberculosis.

See also
 Timeline of Boston, 1890s-1900s

References

External links
 Hibbard election records at ourcampaigns.com

1864 births
1910 deaths
Mayors of Boston
20th-century deaths from tuberculosis
Massachusetts Republicans
19th-century American politicians
Harvard University alumni
People from Dorchester, Massachusetts
Tuberculosis deaths in Massachusetts